Zakaria Asidah (born June 22, 1972 in Frederiksberg, Hovedstaden, Denmark) is a Danish Taekwondo athlete. Asidah won the silver medal in heavyweight (over 84 kg) at the 2003 World Taekwondo Championships in Garmisch-Partenkirchen, Germany. He is also  a three-time World Cup heavyweight medalist (1 silver, 2 bronze), and participated in the 2004 Athens Olympics.

He currently trains at Hwarang Taekwondo Klub in Rødovre and Tan Gun Sae Sim Københavns Taekwondo Klub

References
 sports-reference

1972 births
Living people
Danish male taekwondo practitioners
Taekwondo practitioners at the 2004 Summer Olympics
Olympic taekwondo practitioners of Denmark
Sportspeople from Frederiksberg
European Taekwondo Championships medalists
World Taekwondo Championships medalists